The Commission for Religious Relations with Muslims is a body within the Roman Curia tasked with maintaining positive theological ties with Muslims. It is distinct unit within the Pontifical Council for Interreligious Dialogue, and the President of the council is also President of the commission.

The Secretary of the Commission for Religious Relations with Muslims is Khaled Akasheh, who became head of the Council's Office for Islam on 16 June 2003.

The commission has its own consultors, who are appointed by the pope.
 Cornelius Afebu Omonokhua, priest and director of the Department for Inter-religious Dialogue of the Catholic Secretariat of Nigeria;
 Amir Jaje, Dominican priest and secretary of the Episcopal Commission for Inter-religious Dialogue of the Assembly of Catholic Bishops of Iraq;
 Felix Korner, Jesuit priest and professor of the theology of religions at the Pontifical Gregorian University;
 Rotraud Wielandt, professor of Islamic studies at the University of Bamberg, Germany;
 Ian Netton, vice director of Arab and Islamic studies at the University of Exeter and professor of Islamic studies at Sharjah, United Arab Emirates
Romana Bashir, head of the Christian Study Centre in Rawalpindi, Pakistan

Pope Francis named several new consultors on 21 February 2020. They included a Nigerian priest; two Jesuits, one French based in Rome and one Indonesian; and three lay scholars from Italy, Germany, and the United States.

See also
 Christianity and Islam
 Interfaith dialogue
 Islam and other religions
 John Paul II Center for Interreligious Dialogue
 Muhammad's views on Christians
 Nigerian Chrislam

References

External links
Commission for Religious Relations with Muslims

Catholicism and Islam
Christian and Islamic interfaith dialogue
Pontifical Council for Interreligious Dialogue